Mandaic may refer to:

 Mandaic language
 Mandaic alphabet
 Mandaic (Unicode block)

Language and nationality disambiguation pages